BTR may refer to:

Arts and entertainment

Music
 B.T.R. (band), a Bulgarian rock band
 Bad Trip Records, an American record label
 Beyond Therapy Records, an American industrial music record label
 Big Tent Revival, a Christian rock band
 Big Time Rush (group), a musical group created by Nickelodeon for the TV series
 BTR (album), their debut album
 Big Time Rush (Big Time Rush song)
 Black Toast Records, a record label
 Born to Run, a 1975 rock album by Bruce Springsteen
 "Born to Run" (Bruce Springsteen song)
 Black The Ripper, a British rapper

Other media
 Big Time Rush, a Nickelodeon television series
 BlogTalkRadio
 British Tape Recorders, reel-to-reel tape recorders made by EMI in England

Businesses
 BTR Aerospace Group
 BTR plc, formerly BTR Industries, one of the predecessor companies of Invensys plc
 British Thomson-Houston (former name BTR), a British engineering and heavy industrial company

Politics
 Biological Threat Reduction, a program of the US Defense Threat Reduction Agency
 BTR–EMS–AKG Janakeeya Vedi, a political group in India
 B. T. Ranadive (1904–1990), Indian communist leader

Sports
 Bakersfield Train Robbers, a professional baseball team in Bakersfield, California
 Barcelona Trail Races
 Be the Reds!, a Korean football slogan

Transportation

Aviation
 Baton Rouge Metropolitan Airport, Louisiana, US

Rail
 Ballard Terminal Railroad, operates railroads in western Washington
 Baton Rouge, Louisiana, USA (Amtrak railroad station code)
 Braintree railway station (England), station code

Road transport
 BTR (vehicle), a series of Soviet/Russian armored personnel carriers
 Barrackpore Trunk Road, West Bengal, India
 Batang-Semarang Toll Road, Central Java, Indonesia
 Ruf BTR, a sportscar